Jorge Marcos Pombo Escobar (born 22 February 1994) is a Spanish footballer who plays as an attacking midfielder for Racing de Santander.

Club career
Born in Zaragoza, Pombo played youth football with local clubs Real Zaragoza and UD Amistad. He made his senior debut with the former's reserves on 6 October 2013, coming on as a substitute in a 2–0 Tercera División away win against CD Oliver.

On 17 May 2015, Pombo suffered a serious knee injury during a 2–8 Segunda División B heavy loss against Valencia CF Mestalla, being sidelined for seven months. After recovering, he continued to appear with the B-team regularly.

Pombo made his professional debut on 7 September 2016, starting in a 1–2 home loss against Real Valladolid, for the season's Copa del Rey. Thirteen days later he made his Segunda División debut, coming on as a substitute for Álex Barrera in a 0–0 away draw against Gimnàstic de Tarragona.

Pombo scored his first professional goal on 26 March 2017, netting the second in a 3–0 away win against Elche CF. On 5 April he renewed his contract until 2020, and after becoming a regular starter under César Láinez, he was definitely promoted to the main squad on 6 June.

On 2 January 2020, Pombo moved to fellow second division side Cádiz CF on loan for the remainder of the campaign. On 22 July, after achieving promotion, the club exercised the obligatory buyout clause and signed him permanently until 2023.

Pombo made his La Liga debut on 12 September 2020, starting in a 0–2 home loss against CA Osasuna. He scored his first goal in the category eight days later, netting his team's last in a 2–0 win at SD Huesca.

On 31 August 2021, Pombo moved to Real Oviedo in the second division, on a one-year loan deal. Upon returning, he terminated his contract with Cádiz on 1 September 2022, and signed a two-year deal with Racing de Santander just hours later.

Career statistics

Club

References

External links

1994 births
Living people
Footballers from Zaragoza
Spanish footballers
Association football midfielders
La Liga players
Segunda División players
Segunda División B players
Tercera División players
Real Zaragoza B players
Real Zaragoza players
Cádiz CF players
Real Oviedo players
Racing de Santander players